"Płyniesz Olzo po dolinie" ("You flow, Olza, down the valley") is a poem by Polish educator and poet Jan Kubisz. It is an unofficial anthem of Cieszyn Silesia, particularly of the Poles in Zaolzie. Its theme is the cultural assimilation of, and loss of national identity by, local Poles. The lyrics are centered on the Olza River, symbol of Cieszyn Silesia and Zaolzie.

It was published in 1889 as Nad Olzą (On the Olza), part of Śpiewy starego Jakuba (Songs of Old Jacob) poetry collection.

Lyrics

Footnotes

References 
 

 

 

Polish minority in Zaolzie
Polish poems
Polish songs
Polish-language songs
European anthems
1889 poems